Francis-Joseph Audet, FRSC (July 29, 1867 Detroit – September 13, 1954) was an American-born Canadian historian and archivist.

Audet was President of the Canadian Historical Association for 1934–1935.

His archive is held at Canadiana.

References

External links 
 https://www.erudit.org/fr/revues/cdd/1996-n51-cdd0336/1012941ar/
 Dictionnaire des auteurs de langue française en Amérique du Nord, 1989, p. 48-49.

1867 births
1954 deaths
Fellows of the Royal Society of Canada
Presidents of the Canadian Historical Association
20th-century Canadian historians
Canadian archivists
Canadian civil servants